Ruan Steenkamp (born 2 February 1993) is a South African rugby union player for the  in Super Rugby, the Griquas (rugby union) in the Currie Cup and the  in the Rugby Challenge. His regular position is flanker or number eight.

Career

Golden Lions / South Africa Schools

He earned several call-ups to play for them at youth tournaments, from as early as primary school level; in 2006, he represented them at the Under-13 Craven Week tournament held in Oudtshoorn. He also played at the Under-16 Grant Khomo Week in 2009 and represented them at the Under-18 Craven Week – the premier high school rugby union competition in South Africa – in both 2010 and 2011.

Steenkamp was also included in the 2011 South Africa Schools squad and he was named captain of the team that beat France 'A' 21–14 in Port Elizabeth.

Steenkamp then also made two appearances for the  side in the 2011 Under-19 Provincial Championship.

Blue Bulls / South Africa Under-20

After high school, Steenkamp moved across the Jukskei River to join the Pretoria-based  prior to the 2012 season. He made eight appearances for the s in the 2012 Under-19 Provincial Championship and also captained the side. He also captained the side in the final, but ended on the losing side as  ran out 22–19 winners.

In 2013, Steenkamp was named captain of the South Africa Under-20 squad for the 2013 IRB Junior World Championship. He started all five matches for a South African side that won the competition in 2012 and attempted to retain the title in the 2013 event held in France. They started off in fine fashion, beating the United States 97–0 in the opening match. Steenkamp scored a try midway through the first half as South Africa ran in 16 tries. South Africa secured a 31–24 victory over England and a 26–19 victory over the hosts France to finish top of Pool A and qualify for the semi-finals. However, a 17–18 defeat by Wales eliminated the defending champions from the competition. They recovered in the third-place play-off match to beat New Zealand 41–34, with Steenkamp getting his second try of the tournament shortly after half-time.

Steenkamp returned to domestic action after the tournament as he played for the s in the 2013 Under-21 Provincial Championship. Despite still being at Under-20 level, he also occasionally captained the side, including their 70–19 victory over  where he started the match in an unfamiliar role of hooker.

Steenkamp again represented and captained the  side in the 2014 Under-21 Provincial Championship. Steenkamp's nine tries during the season was the most by a Blue Bulls player during their victorious campaign.

Steenkamp started the 2015 season by representing university side  in the 2015 Varsity Cup competition. He appeared in their first two fixtures of the season and scored two tries in their 39–24 victory over defending champions . He suffered a posterior cruciate ligament injury that ruled him out for several months, but returned for the  during the 2015 Currie Cup Premier Division season. He made an incident-filled home debut a week later, coming on as a replacement early in the second half, scoring his first senior try fifteen minutes after coming on, but also spending the final minutes of the match in the sin-bin following a 74th-minute yellow card.

External links
 itsrugby.co.uk Profile

References

Alumni of Monument High School
South African rugby union players
Living people
1993 births
People from Krugersdorp
Rugby union flankers
South African people of Dutch descent
Rugby union number eights
Blue Bulls players
South Africa Under-20 international rugby union players
Rugby union players from Gauteng
Bulls (rugby union) players
Edinburgh Rugby players
Griquas (rugby union) players